Urie may refer to:

River Urie, Scotland
Urie (name), including a list of people with the name
Urie, Wyoming, United States
Urie Lingey, Shetland Islands

See also
Uri (disambiguation)
Ury (disambiguation)
Urey (disambiguation)